Michael Špaček (born 9 April 1997) is a Czech professional ice hockey forward. He currently plays with HC Ambri-Piotta in the National League (NL). Špaček was born in Mariánské Lázně, Czech Republic, but grew up in Dašice, Czech Republic.

Playing career
Špaček made his Czech Extraliga debut playing with HC Pardubice at age 17, during the 2013–14 season. Špaček had played as a youth within the Pardubice organization since 2010. In his first full professional campaign with Pardubice in 2014–15, Špaček contributed 12 points in 40 games. Spacek was selected in the 4th round, 108th overall by the Winnipeg Jets in the 2015 NHL Entry Draft.   Špaček competed for the Red Deer Rebels of the WHL, during the 2015–16 season.

On 2 June 2017, after two seasons with Red Deer, Špaček completed his junior career by agreeing to a three-year, entry-level contract with the Winnipeg Jets.

During the 2019–20 season, re-assigned to the Manitoba Moose of the AHL, Špaček appeared in 45 games posting 20 points assists before he was re-assigned by the Jets to join the Ontario Reign, primary affiliate of the Los Angeles Kings, on loan for the remainder of the season on 2 March 2020. Špaček failed to appear in a game with the Reign due to injury before the season was prematurely ended due to the COVID-19 pandemic.

As an impending restricted free agent from the Jets, Špaček opted to halt his NHL aspirations by agreeing to a one-year contract in Finland with Tappara of the Liiga on 4 August 2020. His rights were later relinquished by the Jets on 4 October 2020. In the 2020–21 season, Špaček registered 5 goals and 13 points through 18 regular season games with Tappara before leaving the club to return to the Czech Republic in joining HC Oceláři Třinec of the ELH for the remainder of the season on 26 January 2021. Špaček made an immediate impact with Třinec, collecting 14 points in 16 playoff games to help the club claim the Championship.

As a free agent, Špaček joined his third European club within the year, agreeing to a two-year contract with Swedish outfit Frölunda HC of the SHL on 3 May 2021.

Career statistics

Regular season and playoffs

International

References

External links

1997 births
Living people
HC Ambrì-Piotta players
Czech ice hockey right wingers
HC Dynamo Pardubice players
Manitoba Moose players
HC Oceláři Třinec players
Red Deer Rebels players
People from Mariánské Lázně
Tappara players
Winnipeg Jets draft picks
Ice hockey players at the 2022 Winter Olympics
Olympic ice hockey players of the Czech Republic
Sportspeople from the Karlovy Vary Region
Czech expatriate ice hockey players in Canada
Czech expatriate ice hockey players in Finland
Czech expatriate ice hockey players in Sweden
Czech expatriate ice hockey players in Switzerland